In baseball, a closing pitcher, more frequently referred to as a closer (abbreviated CL), is a relief pitcher who specializes in getting the final outs in a close game when his team is leading. The role is often assigned to a team's best reliever. Before the 1990s, pitchers in similar roles were referred to as a fireman, short reliever, and stopper.  A small number of closers have won the Cy Young Award. Eight closers have been inducted into the Baseball Hall of Fame: Dennis Eckersley, Rollie Fingers, Goose Gossage, Trevor Hoffman, Mariano Rivera, Lee Smith, Bruce Sutter and Hoyt Wilhelm.

Usage
A closer is generally a team's best reliever and designated to pitch the last few outs of games when his team is leading by a margin of three runs or fewer.  Rarely does a closer enter with his team losing or in a tie game. A closer's effectiveness has traditionally been measured by the save, an official Major League Baseball (MLB) statistic since 1969. Over time, closers have become one-inning specialists typically brought in at the beginning of the ninth inning in save situations. The pressure of the last three outs of the game is often cited for the importance attributed to the ninth inning.

Closers are often the highest paid relievers on their teams, making money on par with starting pitchers. In the rare cases where a team does not have one primary pitcher dedicated to this role, the team is said to have a closer by committee.

History

New York Giants manager John McGraw in 1905 was one of the first to use a relief pitcher to save games. He pitched Claude Elliott in relief eight times in his ten appearances. Though saves were not an official statistic until 1969, Elliot was retroactively credited with six saves that season, a record at that time. In 1977, Chicago Cubs manager Herman Franks used Bruce Sutter almost exclusively in the eighth or ninth innings in save situations. While relievers such as Rollie Fingers and Goose Gossage were already being used mostly in save situations, Franks's use of Sutter represented an incremental change. Sutter was the first pitcher to start the ninth inning in 20 percent of his career appearances. Clay Carroll in 1972 was the first pitcher to make a third of his season's appearances in the beginning of the ninth inning, which would not be repeated until Fingers in 1982. John Franco in 1987 was the first to be used over 50 percent of the time in the beginning of the ninth in a season; he had a then-record 24 one-inning saves. Lee Smith in 1994 was the first to be used over 75 percent of the time in that situation. Using the save leader from each team in the league, the average closer made his appearances in the beginning of the ninth inning 10 percent of the time in the 1970s to almost  of the time by 2004.

Tony La Russa while with the Oakland Athletics is frequently named as the innovator of the position, making Dennis Eckersley the first player to be used almost exclusively in ninth inning situations. La Russa explained that "[the Oakland A's would] be ahead a large number of games every week ... That's a lot of work for somebody throwing more than one inning ... Also, there was the added advantage of [Eckersley] not getting overexposed. We tried to get [him] to only face three or four batters an outing." Baseball teams often copy one another, following a strategy based on one team's success. In 1990, Bobby Thigpen set a record with 57 saves while breaking Franco's one-inning saves record with 41. Francisco Rodríguez set the current record with 54 one-inning saves in 2008.

As late as 1989, a team's ace reliever was called a fireman, coming to the rescue to "put out the fire", baseball terminology for stopping an offensive rally with runners on base. They were occasionally referred to as short relievers, stoppers and closers. By the early 1990s, the top late-inning reliever was called a closer. The firemen came in whenever leads were in jeopardy, usually with men on base, and regardless of the inning and often pitching two or three innings while finishing the game. An example of this is that Goose Gossage had 17 games where he recorded at least 10 outs in his first season as a closer, including three games where he went seven innings. He pitched over 130 innings as a reliever in three different seasons. For their careers, Sutter and Gossage had more saves of at least two innings than saves where they pitched one inning or less. Fingers was the only pitcher who pitched at least three innings in more than 10 percent of his saves. The game evolved to where the best reliever was reserved for games where the team had a lead of three runs or less in the ninth inning. Mariano Rivera, considered one of the greatest closers of all time, earned only one save of seven-plus outs in his career, while Gossage logged 53. "Don't tell me [Rivera's] the best relief pitcher of all-time until he can do the same job I did. He may be the best modern closer, but you have to compare apples to apples. Do what we did", said Gossage.

Strategy

ESPN.com writer Jim Caple wrote that closers' saves in the ninth "merely conclude what is usually a foregone conclusion." Dave Smith of Retrosheet researched the seasons 1930–2003 and found that the winning percentage for teams who enter the ninth inning with a lead has remained virtually unchanged over the decades. One-run leads after eight innings have been won roughly 85 percent of the time, two-run leads 94 percent of the time, and three-run leads about 96 percent of the time. Baseball Prospectus projects that teams could gain as much as four extra wins a year by focusing on bringing their ace reliever into the game earlier in more critical situations with runners on base instead of holding them out to accumulate easier ninth inning saves. In The Book: Playing the Percentages in Baseball, Tom Tango et al. wrote that there was more value to having the ace reliever enter in the eighth inning with a one- or a two-run lead instead of the ninth with a three-run lead. "Managers feel the need to please their closers—and their closers' agents—by getting them cheap saves to pad their stats and their bank accounts", wrote Caple. Tango et al. projected that using a great reliever over an average one to start the ninth with a three-run lead resulted in a two percent increase in wins, versus four percent for a two-run lead or six percent for a one-run lead. Former Baltimore Orioles manager Johnny Oates once told Jerome Holtzman, the inventor of the save statistic, that he created the ninth-inning pitcher by inventing the save. Holtzman disagreed, saying it was baseball managers who were responsible for not bringing in their top reliever when the game was on the line, in the seventh or eighth inning, which had been the practice in the past. He noted that managers' usage of closers can "abuse the pitching save ... to favor the closer."

La Russa says it is important that relievers know their roles and the situations which they will be called into a game. He added, "Sure, games can get away from you in the seventh and eighth, but those last three outs in the ninth are the toughest. You want the guy who can handle that pressure. That, to me, is most important." Oakland general manager Billy Beane said there would be too much media criticism if a pitcher other than the closer lost the game in the ninth." Managerial moves are immediately questioned with millions of fans having access to ESPN, the MLB Network, and other cable channels. Former manager Jim Fregosi said managers do not like to be second-guessed. "Even if you know the odds, it's more comfortable being wrong when you go to the closer", said Beane.  He noted the incremental increase gained by a closer in a three-run save situation "is worth it because losing is so painful in that situation." Baseball announcer Chris Wheeler noted that there is pressure on managers to pitch closers in the ninth inning when they were paid big money to pitch in that role. Former general manager Pat Gillick said closers become one-inning pitchers as managers began copying the practice of having setup pitchers enter before closers. "There are just too many specialists, guys who can only pitch one inning and only pitch certain innings and throw only 20 pitches. I think most pitchers are capable of pitching more", said Gillick.

Criticism
La Russa noted that losing clubs risk their closer being under-worked, if they stick to the strategy of saving them for ninth inning situations where the team is ahead. An instance of this was Philadelphia Phillies manager Charlie Manuel, who did not call upon closer Jonathan Papelbon in high leverage situations during the 2012 season, including six games where the score was tied during the late innings, which may have cost the team seven wins by midseason. Jonah Keri suggested "fear of using pitchers in anything but the most predictable circumstances, or simple inertia, closers get used far more often in easy-to-manage, up-two, bases-empty, ninth-inning situations than they do in tie games with runners on and the game actually on the line" and said of Papelbon "unless the Phillies start using him in situations where he’s actually needed, rather than almost exclusively in spots that nearly any pitcher with a pulse can handle successfully 85–90 percent of the time, Papelbon will remain the $200,000 Aston Martin that never leaves the garage".

Some critics have noted that the 9th inning closer strategy is illogical during playoff games, especially when the club is facing elimination. During Games 4 and 6 of the 2010 NLCS, each a late-inning situation with the score tied, Phillies manager Charlie Manuel did not call upon closer Brad Lidge and both times the selected relief pitcher surrendered the game-winning run. Similarly in Games 3 and 6 of the 2010 ALCS, each where the New York Yankees were trailing by two runs during a crucial inning, manager Joe Girardi did not go to Mariano Rivera, and both times the chosen relief pitcher gave up several runs which put the game out of reach for the Yankees; ESPN's Matthew Wallace lamented that "Girardi used Rivera in the ninth inning of Game 6, with the Yankees trailing 6–1, their ship long sailed to sea".

Hall of Fame
Eight pitchers who were primarily relievers have been inducted into the Baseball Hall of Fame. Hoyt Wilhelm was the first to be elected in 1985, followed by Rollie Fingers, Dennis Eckersley, Bruce Sutter, Goose Gossage, Trevor Hoffman, Lee Smith, and Mariano Rivera. Eckersley was the first closer in the one-inning save era to be inducted. He believed that he was inducted because he was both a starter and a reliever. "If I came up today as a closer and played 20 years, would I have made it [into the  Hall of Fame]? These pitchers did the job they were supposed to do for 20 years. What else are they supposed to do?" said Eckersley. Rivera was elected in 2019 and was the first player in MLB history to be elected unanimously by the Baseball Writers' Association of America, appearing on all 425 ballots.

Major awards and honors won by closers

Major League Baseball

* Won both the league Cy Young Award and league Most Valuable Player Award in the same year

Nippon Professional Baseball

See also
Baseball awards#Japan
Baseball awards#United States

Notes

References

External links

Major League Baseball Career Saves Leaders
Major League Baseball Single Season Saves Leaders
Major League Baseball Active Saves Leaders

Baseball pitching
Baseball strategy